Ferdinand von Sammern-Frankenegg (17 March 1897 – 20 September 1944) was an Austrian SS functionary during the Nazi era. He was born in Grieskirchen. Von Sammern-Frankenegg served in World War I as a member of the Kaiserschützen, then of the K.u.k. Feldjäger and then after Austria-Hungary had formally surrendered, in the German Freikorps Oberland and the Steirischer Heimatschutz. Ferdinand von Sammern-Frankenegg earned his PhD in legal studies at the University of Innsbruck in 1922. He had been a member of the dueling fraternity Universitätssängerschaft Skalden zu Innsbruck. Von Sammern-Frankenegg worked as a lawyer in Peuerbach.

He served as SS and Police Leader of the Warsaw area in German-occupied Poland from 1941 until 1943 during World War II. 

Sammern-Frankenegg was in charge of the Großaktion Warschau, the single most deadly operation against the Jews in the course of the Holocaust in occupied Poland, which entailed sending between 254,000 and 265,000 men, women and children aboard overcrowded Holocaust trains to the extermination camp in Treblinka. The "liquidation" of the Warsaw Ghetto between 23 July and 21 September 1942 was disguised as a "resettlement action" in order to trick the victims into cooperating. It was a major part of the murderous campaign codenamed Operation Reinhard in the Final Solution. Von Sammern-Frankenegg remained in Warsaw until his first offensive operation in the suppression of the Warsaw Ghetto Uprising on 19 April 1943, which was unsuccessful.

After the failed offensive, von Sammern-Frankenegg was replaced by Jürgen Stroop, and court-martialed by SS leader Heinrich Himmler on 24 April 1943 for his alleged ineptitude; which, for the SS, meant only one thing: guilty of "defending Jews". He was subsequently transferred to Serbia where in September 1944 he was killed in a Yugoslav partisan ambush near the town of Klašnić.

Notes

References
 "Warsaw Ghetto Uprising" by the United States Holocaust Memorial Museum

1897 births
1943 deaths
University of Innsbruck alumni
Holocaust perpetrators in Poland
SS and Police Leaders
Warsaw Ghetto
SS-Brigadeführer
Members of the Reichstag of Nazi Germany
Recipients of the Iron Cross (1939), 1st class
Recipients of the Order of the Crown of King Zvonimir
20th-century Freikorps personnel
People killed by Yugoslav Partisans